The 1978–79 Essex Senior Football League season was the eighth in the history of Essex Senior Football League, a football competition in England.

League table

The league featured 16 clubs which competed in the league last season, along with one new club:
East Ham United, transferred from the London Spartan League

League table

References

Essex Senior Football League seasons
1978–79 in English football leagues